The Church of the Red Gospel (Karmir Avetaran Yekeghetsi; , Karmir Vank ) or Shamkoretsots Sourb Astvatsatsin Church (meaning Shamkor Inhabitants' Holy Mother of God Church) is a ruined 18th century Armenian church in the Avlabar district of Old Tbilisi, Tbilisi, Georgia.

It was built in 1735 or 1775 or 1808, and renovated during the 19th century.  According to Armenian sources, on April 13, 1989, the church was "blown up" or "destroyed". Georgian officials deny that it was blown up, and ascribed its destruction to the intensity of an earthquake that had struck Tbilisi a day before. At 40 meters, it was the tallest Armenian church in Tbilisi. Today it stands in ruins, with its cupola gone.

Gallery

See also 
 Ejmiatsin Church, a nearby Armenian church
 Armenians in Georgia

References

Bibliography 
  (photographic documentation, newspaper articles)

External links

Photos 
 Before-and-after photos
 Photos of Karmir Avetaran after the explosion 
 Another set after the explosion

Old Tbilisi
Armenian churches in Tbilisi
Churches completed in 1775
Armenian Apostolic churches in Tbilisi